

Events

Pre-1600
241 BC – First Punic War: Battle of the Aegates: The Romans sink the Carthaginian fleet bringing the First Punic War to an end.
 298 – Roman Emperor Maximian concludes his campaign in North Africa and makes a triumphal entry into Carthage.
 947 – The Later Han is founded by Liu Zhiyuan. He declares himself emperor.
1496 – After establishing the city of Santo Domingo, Christopher Columbus departs for Spain, leaving his brother in command. 
1535 – Spaniard Fray Tomás de Berlanga, the fourth Bishop of Panama, discovers the Galápagos Islands by chance on his way to Peru.

1601–1900
1607 – Susenyos I defeats the combined armies of Yaqob and Abuna Petros II at the Battle of Gol in Gojjam, making him Emperor of Ethiopia.
1629 – Charles I dissolves the Parliament of England, beginning the eleven-year period known as the Personal Rule.
1661 – French "Sun King" Louis XIV begins his personal rule of France after the death of his premier, the Cardinal Mazarin.
1735 – An agreement between Nader Shah and Russia is signed near Ganja, Azerbaijan and Russian troops are withdrawn from occupied territories.
1762 – French Huguenot Jean Calas, who had been wrongly convicted of killing his son, dies after being tortured by authorities; the event inspired Voltaire to begin a campaign for religious tolerance and legal reform.
1814 – Emperor Napoleon I is defeated at the Battle of Laon in France.
1830 – The Royal Netherlands East Indies Army is created.
1831 – The French Foreign Legion is created by Louis Philippe, the King of France, from the foreign regiments of the Kingdom of France.
1848 – The Treaty of Guadalupe Hidalgo is ratified by the United States Senate, ending the Mexican–American War.
1861 – El Hadj Umar Tall seizes the city of Ségou, destroying the Bamana Empire of Mali.
1873 – The first Azerbaijani play, The Adventures of the Vizier of the Khan of Lenkaran, prepared by Akhundov, is performed by Hassan-bey Zardabi and dramatist and Najaf-bey Vezirov.
1876 – The first successful test of a telephone is made by Alexander Graham Bell.
1891 – Almon Strowger patents the Strowger switch, a device which led to the automation of telephone circuit switching.

1901–present
1906 – The Courrières mine disaster, Europe's worst ever, kills 1099 miners in northern France.
1909 – By signing the Anglo-Siamese Treaty of 1909, Thailand relinquishes its sovereignty over the Malay states of Kedah, Kelantan, Perlis and Terengganu, which become British protectorates.
1922 – Mahatma Gandhi is arrested in India, tried for sedition, and sentenced to six years in prison, only to be released after nearly two years for an appendicitis operation.
1933 – The Long Beach earthquake affects the Greater Los Angeles Area, leaving around 108 people dead.
1944 – Greek Civil War: The Political Committee of National Liberation is established in Greece by the National Liberation Front.
1945 – World War II: The U.S. Army Air Force firebombs Tokyo, and the resulting conflagration kills more than 100,000 people, mostly civilians.
1949 – Mildred Gillars ("Axis Sally") is convicted of treason.
1952 – Fulgencio Batista leads a successful coup in Cuba.
1959 – Tibetan uprising: Fearing an abduction attempt by China, thousands of Tibetans surround the Dalai Lama's palace to prevent his removal.
1966 – Military Prime Minister of South Vietnam Nguyễn Cao Kỳ sacks rival General Nguyễn Chánh Thi, precipitating large-scale civil and military dissension in parts of the nation.
1969 – In Memphis, Tennessee, James Earl Ray pleads guilty to assassinating Martin Luther King Jr. He later unsuccessfully attempts to recant.
1970 – Vietnam War: Captain Ernest Medina is charged by the U.S. military with My Lai war crimes.
1975 – Vietnam War: Ho Chi Minh Campaign: North Vietnamese troops attack Ban Mê Thuột in the South on their way to capturing Saigon in the final push for victory over South Vietnam.
1977 – Astronomers discover the rings of Uranus.
1989 – Air Ontario Flight 1363, a Fokker F-28 Fellowship, crashes at Dryden Regional Airport in Dryden, Ontario, Canada, killing 24.
1990 – In Haiti, Prosper Avril is ousted 18 months after seizing power in a coup.
2000 – The Dot-com bubble peaks with the NASDAQ Composite stock market index reaching 5,048.62.
2006 – The Mars Reconnaissance Orbiter arrives at Mars.
2017 – The impeachment of President Park Geun-hye of South Korea in response to a major political scandal is unanimously upheld by the country's Constitutional Court, ending her presidency.
2019 – Ethiopian Airlines Flight 302, a Boeing 737 MAX, crashes, leading to all 737 MAX aircraft being grounded worldwide.

Births

Pre-1600
1452 – Ferdinand II, king of Castile and León (d. 1516)
1503 – Ferdinand I, Holy Roman Emperor (d. 1564)
1536 – Thomas Howard, 4th Duke of Norfolk, English politician, Earl Marshal of the United Kingdom (d. 1572)
1596 – Princess Maria Elizabeth of Sweden, daughter of King Charles IX of Sweden (d. 1618)

1601–1900
1604 – Johann Rudolf Glauber, German-Dutch alchemist and chemist (d. 1670)
1628 – François Girardon, French sculptor (d. 1715)
  1628   – Marcello Malpighi, Italian physician and biologist (d. 1694)
1653 – John Benbow, Royal Navy admiral (d. 1702)
1656 – Giacomo Serpotta, Italian Rococo sculptor (d. 1732)
1709 – Georg Wilhelm Steller, German botanist, zoologist, physician, and explorer (d. 1746)
1749 – Lorenzo Da Ponte, Italian-American priest and poet (d. 1838)
1769 – Joseph Williamson, English businessman and philanthropist (d. 1840)
1772 – Karl Wilhelm Friedrich Schlegel, German poet and critic (d. 1829)
1777 – Louis Hersent, French painter (d. 1860)
1787 – Francisco de Paula Martínez de la Rosa y Berdejo, Spanish playwright and politician, Prime Minister of Spain (d. 1862)
  1787   – William Etty, English painter and academic (d. 1849)
1788 – Joseph Freiherr von Eichendorff, German author, poet, playwright, and critic (d. 1857)
  1788   – Edward Hodges Baily, English sculptor (d. 1867)
1789 – Manuel de la Peña y Peña, Mexican lawyer and 20th President (1847) (d. 1850) 
1795 – Joseph Légaré, Canadian painter and glazier, artist, seigneur and political figure (d. 1855)
1810 – Samuel Ferguson, Irish poet and lawyer (d. 1886)
1843 – Evelyn Abbott, English classical scholar (d. 1901)
1844 – Pablo de Sarasate, Spanish violinist and composer (d. 1908)
  1844   – Marie Euphrosyne Spartali, British Pre-Raphaelite painter (d. 1927)
1845 – Alexander III of Russia (d. 1894)
1846 – Edward Baker Lincoln, American son of Abraham Lincoln (d. 1850)
1849 – Hallie Quinn Brown, African-American educator, writer and activist (d. 1949)
1850 – Spencer Gore, English tennis player and cricketer (d. 1906)
1853 – Thomas Mackenzie, Scottish-New Zealand cartographer and politician, 18th Prime Minister of New Zealand (d. 1930)
1867 – Hector Guimard, French-American architect (d. 1942)
  1867   – Lillian Wald, American nurse, humanitarian, and author, founded the Henry Street Settlement (d. 1940)
1870 – David Riazanov, Russian theorist and politician (d. 1938)
1873 – Jakob Wassermann, German-Austrian soldier and author (d. 1934)
1876 – Anna Hyatt Huntington, American sculptor (d. 1973)
1877 – Pascual Ortiz Rubio, Mexican diplomat and president (1930-1932) (d. 1963)
1881 – Jessie Boswell, English painter (d. 1956)
1888 – Barry Fitzgerald, Irish actor (d. 1961)
1890 – Albert Ogilvie, Australian politician, 28th Premier of Tasmania (d. 1939)
1892 – Arthur Honegger, French composer and educator (d. 1955)
  1892   – Gregory La Cava, American director, producer, and screenwriter (d. 1952)
1896 – Frederick Coulton Waugh, British cartoonist, painter, teacher and author (d. 1973)
1900 – Violet Brown, Jamaican supercentenarian, oldest Jamaican ever (d. 2017)  
  1900   – Pandelis Pouliopoulos, Greek lawyer and politician (d. 1943)
1901 – Michel Seuphor, Belgian painter (d. 1999)

1901–present
1903 – Bix Beiderbecke, American cornet player, pianist, and composer (d. 1931)
  1903   – Edward Bawden, British artist and illustrator (d. 1989)
  1903   – Clare Boothe Luce, American playwright, journalist, and diplomat, United States Ambassador to Italy (d. 1987)
1915 – Harry Bertoia, Italian-American sculptor and furniture designer (d. 1978) 
  1915   – Joža Horvat, Croatian writer (d. 2012)
1917 – David Hare, American Surrealist artist, sculptor, photographer and painter (d. 1992)
1918 – Günther Rall, German general and pilot (d. 2009)
1919 – Leonor Oyarzún, Chilean socialite, First Lady of Chile from 1990 to 1994 (d. 2022).
1920 – Alfred Peet, Dutch-American businessman, founded Peet's Coffee & Tea (d. 2007)
1923 – Val Logsdon Fitch, American physicist and academic, Nobel Prize laureate (d. 2015)
1924 – Judith Jones, American literary and cookbook editor (d. 2017)
1925 – Bob Lanier, American lawyer, banker, and politician, Mayor of Houston (d. 2014)
1926 – Marques Haynes, American basketball player (d. 2015)
1927 – Claude Laydu, Belgian-French actor, producer, and screenwriter (d. 2011)
1928 – Sara Montiel, Spanish actress (d. 2013)
  1928   – James Earl Ray, American criminal; assassin of Martin Luther King Jr. (d. 1998)
1929 – Sam Steiger, American journalist and politician (d. 2012)
1930 – Sándor Iharos, Hungarian runner (d. 1996)
1931 – Georges Dor, Canadian author, playwright, and composer (d. 2001)
1932 – Marcia Falkender, Baroness Falkender, English politician (d. 2019)
1934 – Gergely Kulcsár, Hungarian javelin thrower (d. 2020)
1935 – Graham Farmer, Australian footballer and coach (d. 2019)
1936 – Sepp Blatter, Swiss businessman
1938 – Norman Blake, American singer-songwriter and guitarist
  1938   – Ron Mix, American football player
1939 – Asghar Ali Engineer, Indian activist and author (d. 2013)
  1939   – Irina Press, Ukrainian-Russian hurdler and pentathlete (d. 2004)
1940 – Chuck Norris, American actor, producer, and martial artist
  1940   – David Rabe, American playwright and screenwriter
1943 – Peter Berresford Ellis, English historian and author
1945 – Katharine Houghton, American actress and playwright
  1945   – Madhavrao Scindia, Indian politician, Indian Minister of Railways (d. 2001)
1946 – Curley Culp, American football player (d. 2021)
  1946   – Gérard Garouste, French contemporary artist
  1946   – Jim Valvano, American basketball player and coach (d. 1993)
1947 – Kim Campbell, Canadian lawyer and politician, Prime Minister of Canada
  1947   – Tom Scholz, American rock musician
1948 – Austin Carr, American basketball player
1951 – Gloria Diaz, Filipino actress and beauty queen, Miss Universe 1969 
1952 – Morgan Tsvangirai, Zimbabwean politician, Prime Minister of Zimbabwe (d. 2018)
1953 – Paul Haggis, Canadian director, producer, and screenwriter
1955 – Toshio Suzuki, Japanese race car driver
1956 – Robert Llewellyn, English actor, producer, and screenwriter
  1956   – Larry Myricks, American long jumper and sprinter
1957 – Osama bin Laden, Saudi Arabian terrorist, founded al-Qaeda (d. 2011)
1958 – Garth Crooks, English footballer and sportscaster
  1958   – Steve Howe, American baseball player (d. 2006)
  1958   – Sharon Stone, American actress and producer
1961 – Laurel Clark, American captain, physician, and astronaut (d. 2003)
1962 – Jasmine Guy, American actress, singer, and director
  1962   – Seiko Matsuda, Japanese singer-songwriter
1963 – Jeff Ament, American bass player and songwriter
  1963   – Rick Rubin, American record producer
1964 – Neneh Cherry, Swedish singer-songwriter
  1964   – Prince Edward, Duke of Edinburgh
1965 – Jillian Richardson, Canadian sprinter
  1965   – Rod Woodson, American football player, coach, and sportscaster
1966 – Mike Timlin, American baseball player
1968 – Pavel Srníček, Czech footballer and coach (d. 2015)
  1968   – Alma Čardžić, Bosnian singer
1971 – Jon Hamm, American actor and director
1972 – Timbaland, American rapper and producer
1973 – Jason Croker, Australian rugby league player and coach
  1973   – Chris Sutton, English footballer
  1973   – Mauricio Taricco, Argentinian footballer and assistant manager
1976 – Barbara Schett, Austrian tennis player
1977 – Shannon Miller, American gymnast
  1977   – Robin Thicke, American singer, songwriter, and record producer
1978 – Camille, French singer-songwriter and actress
  1978   – Benjamin Burnley, American musician
1981 – Samuel Eto'o, Cameroonian footballer
  1981   – Steven Reid, English-Irish footballer
1982 – Kwame Brown, American basketball player
  1982   – Logan Mankins, American football player
1983 – Étienne Boulay, Canadian football player
  1983   – Rafe Spall, English actor
  1983   – Janet Mock, American journalist, author, and activist
  1983   – Carrie Underwood, American singer-songwriter
1984 – Ben May, English footballer
  1984   – Olivia Wilde, American actress and director
1987 – Martellus Bennett, American football player
  1987   – Greg Eastwood, New Zealand rugby league player
  1987   – Māris Štrombergs, Latvian BMX racer
1988 – Josh Hoffman, Australian-New Zealand rugby league player
  1988   – Ego Nwodim, American actress
  1988   – Ivan Rakitić, Croatian football player
1990 – Stefanie Vögele, Swiss tennis player
1992 – Neeskens Kebano, French-born Congolese international footballer
1993 – Jack Butland, English footballer
  1993   – Aminata Namasia, Congolese politician
1994 – Bad Bunny, Puerto Rican rapper and singer
  1994   – Nikita Parris, English footballer
1995 – DaeSean Hamilton, American football player
  1995   – Zach LaVine, American basketball player
  1995   – Sergey Mozgov, Russian ice dancer
1997 – Belinda Bencic, Swiss tennis player
1998 – Justin Herbert, American football player

Deaths

Pre-1600
 483 – Pope Simplicius
 948 – Liu Zhiyuan, Shatuo founder of the Later Han dynasty (b. 895)
1291 – Arghun, Mongol ruler in Persia (b. c.1258)
1315 – Agnes Blannbekin, Austrian mystic
1513 – John de Vere, 13th Earl of Oxford, English commander and politician, Lord High Constable of England (b. 1442)
1528 – Balthasar Hübmaier, German/Moravian Anabaptist leader
1572 – William Paulet, 1st Marquess of Winchester
1585 – Rembert Dodoens, Flemish physician and botanist (b. 1517)

1601–1900
1682 – Jacob van Ruisdael, Dutch painter and etcher (b. 1628)
1724 – Urban Hjärne, Swedish chemist, geologist, and physician (b. 1641)
1776 – Élie Catherine Fréron, French author and critic (b. 1718)
1792 – John Stuart, 3rd Earl of Bute, Scottish politician, Prime Minister of the United Kingdom (b. 1713)
1826 – John Pinkerton, Scottish antiquarian, cartographer, author, numismatist and historian (b. 1758)
1832 – Muzio Clementi, Italian pianist, composer, and conductor (b. 1752)
1861 – Taras Shevchenko, Ukrainian poet, playwright, and ethnographer (b. 1814)
1872 – Giuseppe Mazzini, Italian journalist and politician (b. 1805)
1895 – Charles Frederick Worth, English-French fashion designer (b. 1825)
1897 – Savitribai Phule, Indian poet and activist (b. 1831)
1898 – Marie-Eugénie de Jésus, French nun and saint, founded the Religious of the Assumption (b. 1817)

1901–present
1910 – Karl Lueger, Austrian lawyer and politician Mayor of Vienna (b. 1844)
  1910   – Carl Reinecke, German pianist, composer, and conductor (b. 1824)
1913 – Harriet Tubman, American nurse and activist (b. c.1820)
1925 – Myer Prinstein, Polish-American jumper (b. 1878)
1937 – Yevgeny Zamyatin, Russian journalist and author (b. 1884)
1940 – Mikhail Bulgakov, Russian novelist and playwright (b. 1891)
1942 – Wilbur Scoville, American pharmacist and chemist (b. 1865)
1948 – Zelda Fitzgerald, American author, visual artist, and ballet dancer (b. 1900)
  1948   – Jan Masaryk, Czech soldier and politician (b. 1886)
1951 – Kijūrō Shidehara, Japanese lawyer and politician, Prime Minister of Japan (b. 1872)
1966 – Frits Zernike, Dutch physicist and academic, Nobel Prize laureate (b. 1888)
  1966   – Frank O'Connor, Irish short story writer, novelist, and poet (b. 1903)
1977 – E. Power Biggs, English-American organist and composer (b. 1906)
1985 – Konstantin Chernenko, Russian soldier and politician, Head of State of The Soviet Union (b. 1911)
  1985   – Bob Nieman, American baseball player (b. 1927)
1986 – Ray Milland, Welsh-American actor and director (b. 1907)
1988 – Andy Gibb, Australian singer-songwriter and actor (b. 1958)
1992 – Giorgos Zampetas, Greek bouzouki player and composer (b. 1925)
1996 – Ross Hunter, American film producer (b. 1926)
1997 – LaVern Baker, American singer and actress (b. 1929)
1998 – Lloyd Bridges, American actor and director (b. 1913)
1999 – Oswaldo Guayasamín, Ecuadorian painter and sculptor (b. 1919)
2005 – Dave Allen, Irish-English comedian, actor, and screenwriter (b. 1936)
2007 – Ernie Ladd, American football player and wrestler (b. 1938)
2010 – Muhammad Sayyid Tantawy, Egyptian scholar and academic (b. 1928)
  2010   – Corey Haim, Canadian actor (b. 1971)
2011 – Bill Blackbeard, American author and illustrator (b. 1926)
2012 – Jean Giraud, French author and illustrator (b. 1938)
  2012   – Frank Sherwood Rowland, American chemist and academic, Nobel Prize laureate (b. 1927)
2013 – Princess Lilian, Duchess of Halland, British born Swedish Princess (b.1915)
2015 – Richard Glatzer, American director, producer, and screenwriter (b. 1952)
2016 – Ken Adam, German-English production designer and art director (b. 1921)
  2016   – Roberto Perfumo, Argentinian footballer and sportscaster
  2016   – Jovito Salonga, Filipino lawyer and politician, 14th President of the Senate of the Philippines (b. 1920)
  2016   – Anita Brookner, English novelist and art historian (b. 1928)
2022 – John Elliott, English historian and academic (b. 1930)

Holidays and observances
Christian feast day
Attala
Harriet Tubman (Lutheran)
John Ogilvie
Macarius of Jerusalem
Marie-Eugénie de Jésus
Pope Simplicius
Sojourner Truth (Lutheran)
March 10 (Eastern Orthodox liturgics)
Harriet Tubman Day (United States of America)
Holocaust Remembrance Day (Bulgaria)
Mario Day (Globally)
Men's Day (Poland)
National Women and Girls HIV/AIDS Awareness Day (United States)
Székely Freedom Day (Romania)
Tibetan Uprising Day (Tibetan independence movement)

References

External links

 BBC: On This Day
 
 Historical Events on March 10

Days of the year
March